Mazdacis is a genus of snout moths. The genus was erected by Maria Alma Solis in 1993.

Species
 Mazdacis consimilis
 Mazdacis flavomarginata
 Mazdacis zenoa

References

Epipaschiinae
Pyralidae genera